The Scarlet Letter is a 2004 South Korean erotic thriller film about a police detective who investigates a murder case while struggling to hang onto his relationships with his wife and mistress. Although the film was based on a 1850 novel of the same name, it takes the title from the novel instead. It is the second film by La Femis-graduate and academic Byun Hyuk (Daniel H. Byun) after the Dogme 95 film Interview (2000), and starred Han Suk-kyu, Lee Eun-ju, Sung Hyun-ah and Uhm Ji-won. The film debuted as the closing film of the Pusan International Film Festival in 2004. The film is based on novelist Kim Young-ha's short stories A Meditation On Mirror and Photo Shop Murder.

The Scarlet Letter was released in October 28, 2004 on South Korea.

Plot
Lee Ki-hoon is an alpha male homicide detective; intelligent and with animal instincts. His wife, classical cellist Han Soo-hyun, is submissive and seemingly perfect. Meanwhile, he is carrying on a passionate affair with his mistress Choi Ga-hee, a sultry jazz singer at a nightclub. Ki-hoon lives a double life by moving back and forth between these two women, who also happen to be schoolmates from high school. One day Ki-hoon goes to a murder scene and there he meets Ji Kyung-hee, a woman accused of murdering her husband.

Cast
Han Suk-kyu – Lee Ki-hoon
Lee Eun-ju – Choi Ga-hee
Uhm Ji-won – Han Soo-hyun
Sung Hyun-ah – Ji Kyung-hee
Kim Jin-geun – Jung Myung-sik
Kim Min-sung – Detective Jo
Jung In-gi – Detective Ahn
Choi Kyu-hwan – Detective Choi
Kim Hye-jin – Oh Yeon-sim
Do Yong-gu – President Han
Seol Ji-yoon – Madam

Reception 
Despite Lee Eun-ju's prior experience with depicting sex and nudity in Virgin Stripped Bare by Her Bachelors (2000), she came under the scrutiny of Korean press and netizens, for the highly emotional sex scenes and the notorious "trunk scene" in The Scarlet Letter which is regarded as "one of the most shocking and intense scenes in the history of Korean film." It is speculated her demanding role and its public scrutiny, had compounded and overlapped with an existing variety of family, financial, career, and insomnia issues. Her severe depression ended in suicide in February 2005, and the tragic conclusion has since become the central focus in popular perception and interpretation of the film, this particular one being her last.

Director Kim Ki-duk, no stranger to controversy over his own films, is quoted by Chinese film magazine "Movie Watch" (看電影) in singling out The Scarlet Letter as among the key Korean dramas from recent years. He subsequently cast Sung Hyun-ah, who rose to prominence with her role in The Scarlet Letter, as the heroine in his Time.

At the film's premiere in Japan, veteran actress Kumiko Akiyoshi praised the lead performances and likened the film to a landmark in erotic thrillers after Basic Instinct and Fatal Attraction.

Awards and nominations
2004 Korean Association of Film Critics Awards 
Top Ten Films of the Year

2004 Blue Dragon Film Awards 
 Nomination – Best Actor – Han Suk-kyu
 Nomination – Best Actress – Lee Eun-ju
 Nomination – Best Supporting Actress – Uhm Ji-won
 Nomination – Best Music – Lee Jae-jin

2005 Baeksang Arts Awards
 Nomination – Best Actress – Lee Eun-ju

2005 Grand Bell Awards
 Nomination – Best Actress – Lee Eun-ju
 Nomination – Best Art Direction – Kim Ji-soo
 Nomination – Best Costume Design – Jo Yun-mi

References

External links

Production company LJ Film's profile of Director Daniel H. Byun

2004 films
2000s Korean-language films
South Korean LGBT-related films
2000s erotic thriller films
Erotic romance films
South Korean mystery films
South Korean erotic thriller films
Showbox films
2000s South Korean films
Films directed by Byun Hyuk